Malo Golovode is a village in the municipality of Kruševac, Serbia, with a population of 2,369 at the 2002 census.

References

Populated places in Rasina District